Strobilanthes penstemonoides is a species of flowering plant in the family Acanthaceae. It occurs in China, Bhutan, India, and Nepal. Its specific epithet has been spelled as penstemonoides, pentstemonoides, and pentastemonoides.

References

pentastemonoides